Speech for the Defence is a 1976 Soviet drama film directed by Vadim Abdrashitov.

Plot 
The film tells about a woman named Valentina Kostina, who is accused of attempted murder of her lover and pleads guilty, but despite this, her lawyer is trying to find an excuse.

Cast 
 Galina Yatskina as Irina Mezhnikova
 Marina Neyolova as Valentina Kostina
 Oleg Yankovskiy as Ruslan
 Stanislav Lyubshin as Fedyayev
 Viktor Shulgin as Mezhnikov
 Aleksey Alekseev as Judge
 Valentina Berezutskaya as Kuznetsova
 Anatoliy Grachyov
 Eduard Izotov as Arkadii Stepanovich
 Elena Kebal as Svetlana

References

External links 
 

1976 films
1970s Russian-language films
Soviet drama films
1976 drama films